King Street Overhead Bridge is a historic overhead bridge located at Kings Mountain, Cleveland County, North Carolina.  It was built in 1938–1939, and is a reinforced concrete Moderne-style rigid-frame vehicular bridge.  It measures about 48 feet long and 49 feet wide and carries West King Street over the Norfolk Southern Railway railroad tracks.

It was listed on the National Register of Historic Places in 2005.

References

Kings Mountain, North Carolina
Road bridges on the National Register of Historic Places in North Carolina
Moderne architecture in North Carolina
Bridges completed in 1939
Buildings and structures in Cleveland County, North Carolina
National Register of Historic Places in Cleveland County, North Carolina
Concrete bridges in the United States